Pouteria glomerata is a species of plant in the family Sapotaceae. It is distributed from Mexico to North-East Argentina. Its greatest presence is in Brazil, where it is known as abiurana-do-igapó (wetland abiurana). Mature fruit has a smooth and yellow pericarp, with four ovary locules. The subspecies Pouteria glomerata subsp. stylosa is endemic to the Amazon Basin, where it is called abiurana-roxa (purple abiurana).

References

glomerata
Flora of Brazil
Trees of Brazil
Trees of the Amazon